McClanahan v. Arizona State Tax Comm'n, 411 U.S. 164 (1973), was a case in which the Supreme Court of the United States holding that Arizona has no jurisdiction to impose a tax on the income of Navajo Indians residing on the Navajo Reservation and whose income is wholly derived from reservation sources.

Background
Rosalind McClanahan was an enrolled member of the Navajo Nation in Arizona. In 1967, all of her income came from work on the Navajo Reservation; $16.20 was withheld from her wages. She requested a refund of the entire amount and protested the collection of state taxes. When the state declined her claim, she filed an action in the Arizona Superior Court. The court dismissed her case for failure to state a claim. McClanahan appealed to the Arizona Court of Appeals, which affirmed. The Arizona Supreme Court declined to hear the case, and the United States Supreme Court granted certiorari to hear the case.

Decision
Justice Thurgood Marshall delivered the opinion of a unanimous court.  Marshall found that there was nothing in federal law that authorized Arizona to collect a state income tax from an Indian that earned the income on the reservation.  The case was reversed.

References

External links
 

1973 in United States case law
United States Supreme Court cases
United States Supreme Court cases of the Burger Court
United States Native American tax case law
Navajo history
Taxation in Arizona
United States taxation and revenue case law
Native American history of Arizona